Matt Barber may refer to:

 Matt Barber (athlete) (1956–2020), Australian shot put champion and athletics coach
 Matt Barber (actor) (born 1983), British actor

See also
 Matthew Barber (born 1977), Canadian singer-songwriter